Marie-Paule Miller (born 7 April 1968) is a former French female deaf sprinter and heptathlete. She made her Deaflympic debut at the 1993 Summer Deaflympics which was also her only appearance in the Deaflympics event.

In the 1993 Summer Deaflympics, she took part in the women's 200m and women's heptathlon events representing France at the Deaflympics in her only opportunity to represent the nation at a multi-sport event. She claimed gold medal in the women's heptathlon event as a part of the 1993 Summer Deaflympics with an aggregate points of 3910, which also ended up as the only medal that was claimed by her in her Deaflympic career.

References 

1968 births
Living people
French female sprinters
French heptathletes
Deaf competitors in athletics
French deaf people
People from Salon-de-Provence
Sportspeople from Bouches-du-Rhône
20th-century French women